Giorgio's Music is a 1973 album composed, produced and performed by Giorgio Moroder recorded in Germany. Donna Summer sung backing vocals uncredited on "Hilf Dir Selbst".

Track listing

"Marrakesch" (Moroder, Pete Bellotte, Hans-Ulrich Prost) - 4:04
"Viel Glück, Christina [Good Grief Christina]" (Moroder, Michael Holm) - 3:52
"Her Mit Dem Geld" (Moroder, Prost) - 3:30
"Viele Phrasen [Crippled Words]" (Moroder, Prost) - 3:33
"Zigaretten Und Mädchen Und Wein [Cigarettes, Women and Wine]" (Moroder, Michael Kunze) - 3:11
"Hilf Dir Selbst [Heaven Helps The Man (Who Helps Himself)]" (Moroder) - 3:07
"Ich Komm Nach Haus" (Moroder, Prost) - 4:11
"Nostalgie" (Moroder, Bellotte, Prost) - 3:19
"Ja, Ja, Ja (Wie Ist Werbung Wunderbar)" (Moroder, Prost) - 3:08
"Eine Alte Melodie  [Lonely Lovers Symphony]" (Moroder, Prost) - 4:55

References

Giorgio Moroder albums
1973 albums
Albums produced by Giorgio Moroder
Casablanca Records albums